Events from the year 1836 in art.

Events
 June – Hablot K. Browne ("Phiz") begins illustrating The Pickwick Papers following the suicide of the original illustrator, Robert Seymour.
 David Wilkie is granted a knighthood.

Works

 Thomas Cole – View from Mount Holyoke, Northampton, Massachusetts, after a Thunderstorm (The Oxbow)
 Jean-Baptiste-Camille Corot – Diana Surprised By Actaeon
 Paul Delaroche – Charles I Insulted by Cromwell's Soldiers
 Jean-Hippolyte Flandrin – Study (Young Male Nude Seated beside the Sea)
 Caspar David Friedrich – Seashore by Moonlight
 Joseph von Führich – Jacob encountering Rachel with her father's herd
 Christian Albrecht Jensen – Hans Christian Andersen
 Antoine Wiertz – Les Grecs et les Troyens se disputant le corps de Patrocle
 Sir David Wilkie – Napoleon and Pius VII at Fontainebleau
 Matthew Cotes Wyatt – Bronze equestrian statue of George III

Births
 January 8 – Lawrence Alma-Tadema, Dutch-English painter (died 1912)
 January 13 – Giuseppe Abbati, painter (died 1868)
 January 14 – Henri Fantin-Latour, painter and lithographer (died 1904)
 February 24 – Winslow Homer, landscape painter (died 1910)+
 March 28 – Emmanuel Benner, French artist (died 1896)
 March 28 – Jean Benner, French artist (died 1906)
 April 27 – Eugen Felix, Austrian painter (died 1906)
May 25 – Lina von Perbandt, German landscape painter (died 1884)
September 6 - John Atkinson Grimshaw, painter (died 1893)
 October 15 – James Tissot, painter (died 1902)
 December 13 – Franz von Lenbach, painter (died 1904)

Deaths
 January 7 – Thomas Henry, French painter and art patron (born 1766)
 January 16 – Heinrich Christoph Kolbe, German portrait painter (born 1771)
 January 24 - Francesco Alberi, Italian painter of historical scenes and frescoes (born 1765)
 February 23 – Ezra Ames, American portrait painter (born 1768)
 March 4 – Matthias Kessels, Dutch sculptor (born 1784)
 April 20 – Robert Seymour, English illustrator (born 1798)
 April 24 – Firmin Didot, French printer, engraver, and type founder (born 1764)
 before April 30 – Louise-Adéone Drölling, French painter and draughtswoman (born 1797)
 October 11 – Giacomo Raffaelli, Italian mosaicist from Rome (born 1753)
 October 17 – Orest Kiprensky, Russian portrait painter (born 1782)
 November 10 – William Frederick Wells, English watercolour painter and etcher (born 1762)
 date unknown
 Pierre-Charles Bridan, French sculptor (born 1766)
 Giovanni Folo, Italian engraver (born 1764)
 Edme-François-Étienne Gois, French sculptor (born 1765)
 Stefano Ticozzi, Italian art historian (born 1762)

References

 
Years of the 19th century in art
1830s in art